Admiral Sir Lionel Victor Wells KCB, DSO (28 November 1884 – 22 April 1965) was a Royal Navy officer who became Admiral Commanding, Orkneys and Shetlands.

Naval career
Wells joined the Royal Navy as a cadet on 15 September 1899. As a midshipman, he was posted to the battleship HMS Majestic in January 1901. He was promoted to lieutenant on 15 March 1905, and captain on 31 December 1924, and he was given command of the cruiser HMS Diomede in 1929. He joined the staff at the Royal Naval War College in 1931 and became captain of the aircraft carrier HMS Eagle in 1933 before going on to be Director of the Tactical School in 1935 and Rear-Admiral 3rd Carrier Squadron in 1937. He served in the Second World War as Vice-Admiral, Aircraft Carriers, from 1939 and as Admiral Commanding, Orkneys and Shetlands from January 1943 before retiring in 1944.

References

1884 births
1965 deaths
Royal Navy admirals
Knights Commander of the Order of the Bath
Companions of the Distinguished Service Order
Military personnel from Staffordshire